Chris Murray (born January 3, 1985 in Roslyn, New York) is a retired American soccer player who most recently played for Wilmington Hammerheads in the USL Professional Division.

Career

College & Amateur
Murray played college soccer at the University of North Carolina Wilmington from 2004 to 2007, where he was named to the All-Colonial Athletic Association second team as a junior in 2005

Murray also played for the Indiana Invaders in the USL Premier Development League.

Professional
Murray turned professional in 2008 when he joined the Wilmington Hammerheads in the USL Second Division. He made his professional debut on April 26, 2008 as a substitute in Wilmington's 2-0 opening day loss to the Bermuda Hogges. Murray stayed with Wilmington for the 2008 and 2009 seasons.

After a year out of the game while the Hammerheads were on hiatus, Murray returned to Wilmington for the 2011 season, signing with the club on March 7, 2011.

Honors

Wilmington Hammerheads
USL Second Division Regular Season Champions (1): 2009

References

External links
 Wilmington Hammerheads bio

1985 births
Living people
American soccer players
UNC Wilmington Seahawks men's soccer players
Indiana Invaders players
Wilmington Hammerheads FC players
USL League Two players
USL Second Division players
USL Championship players
People from Roslyn, New York
Association football midfielders